Abyazan (also Romanized as Abyāzan and Abīāzān; also known as Āb-e Azān and Āb-i-Azān) is a village in Karkas Rural District, in the Central District of Natanz County, Isfahan Province, Iran. At the 2006 census, its population was 94, in 36 families.

References 

Populated places in Natanz County